Musth or must (from Persian) is a periodic condition in bull (male) elephants characterized by aggressive behavior and accompanied by a large rise in reproductive hormones.

Testosterone levels in an elephant in musth can be on average 60 times greater than in the same elephant at other times (in specific individuals these testosterone levels can even reach as much as 140 times the normal). However, whether this hormonal surge is the sole cause of musth or merely a contributing factor is unknown.

Scientific investigation of musth is problematic because even the most placid elephants become violent toward humans and other elephants during musth.
Musth differs from rut in that the female elephant's estrus cycle is not seasonally linked, whereas musth most often takes place in winter. Furthermore, bulls in musth have often been known to attack female elephants, regardless of whether or not the females are in heat.

Effects

Secretions
Elephants in musth often discharge a thick tar-like secretion called temporin from the temporal ducts on the sides of the head. Temporin contains proteins, lipids (notably cholesterol), phenol and 4-methyl phenol, cresols and sesquiterpenes (notably farnesol and its derivatives). Secretions and urine collected from zoo elephants have been shown to contain elevated levels of various highly odorous ketones and aldehydes.

The elephant's aggression may be partially caused by a reaction to the temporin, which naturally trickles down into the elephant's mouth, and (at least to a human)  has a foul taste. Another contributing factor may be the accompanying swelling of the temporal glands, which presses on the elephant's eyes and causes acute pain comparable to severe toothache. Elephants sometimes try to counteract this pain by digging their tusks into the ground.

Behavior
Musth is linked to sexual arousal or establishing dominance, but this relationship is far from clear. Wild bulls in musth often produce a characteristic low, pulsating rumbling noise (known as "musth rumble") which can be heard by other elephants for considerable distances. The rumble has been shown to prompt not only attraction in the form of reply vocalizations from cows in heat, but also silent avoidance behavior from other bulls (particularly juveniles) and non-receptive females, suggesting an evolutionary benefit to advertising the musth state.

Cases of rogue elephants randomly attacking native villages or goring and killing rhinoceroses without provocation in national parks in Africa have been attributed to musth in young male elephants, especially those growing in the absence of older males.  Reintroducing older males into the elephant population of the area tends to prevent younger males from entering musth, and therefore ameliorates this aggressive behavior.

In domesticated elephants

A musth elephant, wild or domesticated, is extremely dangerous to both humans and other elephants. In zoos, bull elephants in musth have killed numerous keepers when normally friendly animals have become uncontrollably enraged. In contrast to normal dominance behavior, bulls in musth will even attack and kill members of their own family, including their own calves. Zoos keeping adult male elephants need strong, purpose-built enclosures to isolate males during their musth, which greatly complicates attempting to breed elephants in zoos; most zoos that keep a single elephant or a small herd typically have only females for this reason.

In Sri Lanka and India, domesticated elephants in musth are traditionally tied to a strong tree and denied food and water, or put on a starvation diet, for several days, after which the musth passes. This method greatly shortens the duration of the musth, typically to five to eight days; sedatives, like xylazine, are also used.

References in popular culture
References to elephants in musth (whose temporin secretion is often referred to as "ichor") are frequent in classical Indian poetry and prose; for example, in the Raghuvaṃśa, Kalidasa says that the king's elephants drip ichor in seven streams to match the scent put forth by the seven-leaved 'sapta-cchada' (= "seven-leaf") tree (perhaps Alstonia scholaris). Some poets turn it around to compare the elephant's ichor to the sapta-cchada. The phenomenon has been described in poetry long before the time of Kalidasa, in Sanskrit, Tamil and Pali literature.

Valmiki, in Sundara Kanda of the Ramayana, makes reference to the Mahendra mountain shedding water like an elephant's rut juice upon being pressed by Hanuman.

Shooting an Elephant is an autobiographical account by George Orwell in which he describes how an elephant in Burma had an attack of musth and killed an Indian, which in turn led to the death of the elephant.

Sangam poetry describes musth. Kummatoor Kannanaar in Pathitrupatthu 12 describes it as follows:

The Tamil movie Kumki, which revolves around a mahout and his trained elephant, shows the elephant in musth towards the climax. Captive elephants are either trained for duties in temples and cultural festivals or trained as a kumki elephant which confronts wild elephants and prevents them from entering villages. Elephants trained for temple duties are of a gentle nature and cannot face wild elephants. In this movie, a tribal village wants to hire a kumki elephant to chase away wild elephants which enter the village every harvest season. The mahout, who needs money, takes his temple-trained elephant to do this job, in the vain hope that wild elephants won't come in. But wild elephants start attacking the village on the harvest day. The temple-trained elephant enters musth and thus fights with the wild elephants, kills the most notorious among the herd, and dies from injuries sustained during the fight.

In his James Bond novel The Man With the Golden Gun, Ian Fleming wrote that the villain, Francisco Scaramanga, was driven to become a cold-blooded assassin after authorities shot an elephant that he had ridden in his circus act because the elephant went on a rampage while in musth.

In Jules Verne's Around the World in Eighty Days, Phileas Fogg buys an elephant which was being fed sugar and butter so it would go into musth for combat purposes; however, the animal has been on this regimen for a relatively short time so the condition has not yet presented.

References

External links

All about elephants in zoo and circus. Elephant encyclopedia written by an elephant keeper
Transport and Maintenance of Musth in Elephants

Elephants